Rudenia sepulturae is a species of moth of the family Tortricidae. It is found in south-eastern Mexico.

The wingspan is about 7.5 mm. The ground colour of the forewings is greyish white with grey suffusions, especially in the distal third of the wing and at the base. The hindwings are grey white, slightly tinged with brownish in the posterior half.

Etymology
The species name refers to La Sepultura, the type locality.

References

Moths described in 2007
Cochylini